Elysius is a genus of moths in the family Erebidae. The genus was erected by Francis Walker in 1855.

Species

Elysius amapaensis Régo Barros, 1971
Elysius anomala Jörgensen, 1935
Elysius atrata (Felder & Rogenhofer, 1874)
Elysius atrobrunnea Rothschild, 1909
Elysius barnesi Schaus, 1904
Elysius carbonarius (Dognin, 1891)
Elysius castanea Rothschild, 1909
Elysius chimaera (H. Druce, 1893)
Elysius cingulata (Walker, 1856)
Elysius conjunctus Rothschild, 1910
Elysius conspersus Walker, 1855
Elysius deceptura (H. Druce, 1905)
Elysius disciplaga (Walker, 1856)
Elysius discopunctata Gaede, 1923
Elysius felderi Rothschild, 1909
Elysius flavoabdominalis Rothschild, 1935
Elysius gladysia Schaus, 1920
Elysius hades (H. Druce, 1906)
Elysius hampsoni Dognin, 1907
Elysius hermia (Cramer, [1777])
Elysius intensa Rothschild, 1935
Elysius intensus Rothschild, 1910
Elysius itaunensis Régo Barros, 1971
Elysius jonesi Rothschild, 1910
Elysius lavinia H. Druce, 1906
Elysius melaleuca (Felder, 1874)
Elysius melanoplaga Hampson, 1901
Elysius meridionalis Rothschild, 1917
Elysius ochrota Hampson, 1901
Elysius ordinaria (Schaus, 1894)
Elysius phantasma Schaus, 1905
Elysius pretiosa Jörgensen, 1935
Elysius proba (Schaus, 1892)
Elysius pyrosticta Hampson, 1905
Elysius rabusculum (Dognin, 1905)
Elysius ruffin Schaus, 1924
Elysius sebrus (H. Druce, 1899)
Elysius subterra Rothschild, 1917
Elysius superba (H. Druce, 1884)
Elysius systron Schaus, 1904
Elysius terra H. Druce, 1906
Elysius terraoides Rothschild, 1909
Elysius thrailkilli (Schaus, 1892)

References

 
Phaegopterina
Moth genera